Drums on Fire Mountain is a 1984 adventure module for the Expert Rules of the Dungeons & Dragons fantasy role-playing game. It was written by Graeme Morris and Tom Kirby and published by TSR.

Plot summary
Drums on Fire Mountain is a scenario describing a jungle island, and the ancient tunnels beneath its volcanic mountain.

The seaways southeast of Thyatis have never been safe, but now it appears that legends of green-skinned pirates and strange living fogs are true. Shipping is being disrupted and an expedition to discover the cause returned crippled with just one prisoner.

This scenario is set southeast of a major empire, on a volcanic island geographically isolated and unrelated to the other powers in the world. The player characters are given a full briefing by the Master of the Seafaring Merchants Guild, and then set off to face a vicious tribe of green-skinned demi-humans who worship a pig "god".

Publication history
X8 Drums on Fire Mountain was published by TSR in 1984 as a 32-page booklet with an outer folder, and was written by Graeme Morris and Tom Kirby, with art by Brian Williams. The module features additional artwork by Paul Ruiz. The scenario was written for the Expert Rules.

Reception
Wendy J. Rose reviewed the module for Imagine magazine, giving it a positive review. She thought that "DMs will love X8" as no matter where the players wander on the island, something has been provided for them. According to Rose, the gamemaster does not have to push the players in any specific direction - they will find their way by themselves  and "have plenty of fun on the way". When they have finally reached the 'dungeon' the players find themselves in "an exciting adventure with lots of interesting little twists and details". Rose noted that the setting is fantastical but "more believable" than Castle Amber. On the downside, Rose noted that the opportunities for roleplaying are limited as many encounters are of the 'attack on sight' variety, which could cause the players to miss out on lots of cultural details the module provides. As to the dungeon, Rose praised the good effect to which the third dimension (up and down) is being used. She felt that "a fair amount of brain as well as brawn" would be needed to really enjoy this module, as its complexities could leave players with only a limited idea of what is going on. Rose finished by saying that the module contains enough material for at least two good gaming sessions and that it is rewarding in terms of loot as well as enjoyment. She called it "worth a try".

Graham Staplehurst reviewed Drums on Fire Mountain for White Dwarf, and gave it 8/10 overall, calling it "Another welcome addition to the range of D&D scenarios". Staplehurst noted that Graeme Morris and Tom Kirby are designers from TSR UK (and that Graeme's name is misspelt on the front cover). He felt that the module "has a mainly Polynesian flavour, with a hint of Amerind and African overtones", making the setting "ideal for translation into any on-going campaign". Staplehurst felt that the module "contains a lot of thoughtful detail and plenty of attention has been paid to the society, history and the whole atmosphere of the island. There are many exciting (and even ) encounters and players and DM alike should find the scenario very satisfying." He concluded the review by stating that "Intelligence has been used in developing the scenario's rationale and balancing it in favour of player skills and enjoyment. Highly recommended."

According to Lawrence Schick, in his 1991 book Heroic Worlds, the scenario "Includes a magic-using devil-swine, so how can you beat it?"

References

Dungeons & Dragons modules
Mystara
Role-playing game supplements introduced in 1984